Leptospermum microcarpum is a species of shrub that is endemic to eastern Australia. It has elliptical to lance-shaped leaves with a sharp point on the tip, white flowers and small fruit that falls from the plant shortly after the seeds are released.

Description
It has variable bark, sometimes thin, rough and fibrous, sometimes smooth. There are broad reddish brown bracts at the base of the flower bud but which fall off before the flower opens.

Taxonomy and naming
Leptospermum microcarpum was first formally described in 1923 by Edwin Cheel in the Journal and Proceedings of the Royal Society of New South Wales. The specific epithet (microcarpum) is a Latin word meaning "small-fruited".

Distribution and habitat
This tea-tree grows on rocky mountains and cliff edges between the Wide Bay district in Queensland and Ashford in northern New South Wales.

References

microcarpum
Flora of New South Wales
Flora of Queensland
Myrtales of Australia
Plants described in 1923